Lorraine is a cultural and historical region in Northeastern France, now located in the administrative region of Grand Est. Its name stems from the medieval kingdom of Lotharingia, which in turn was named after either Emperor Lothair I or King Lothair II. Lorraine later was ruled as the Duchy of Lorraine before the Kingdom of France annexed it in 1766.

From 1982 until January 2016, Lorraine was an administrative region of France. In 2016, under a reorganisation, it became part of the new region Grand Est. As a region in modern France, Lorraine consisted of the four departments Meurthe-et-Moselle, Meuse, Moselle and Vosges (from a historical point of view the Haute-Marne department is located in the region), containing 2,337 communes. Metz is the regional prefecture. The largest metropolitan area of Lorraine is Nancy, which had developed for centuries as the seat of the duchy.

Lorraine borders Germany, Belgium, and Luxembourg. Its inhabitants are called Lorrains and Lorraines in French and number about 2,356,000.

History 

Lorraine's borders have changed often in its long history. The location of Lorraine led to it being a paramount strategic asset as the crossroads of four nations. This, along with its political alliances, marriage alliances, and the ability of rulers over the centuries to choose sides between East and West, gave it a tremendously powerful and important role in transforming all of European history. Its rulers intermarried with royal families over all of Europe, played kingmaker, and seated rulers on the thrones of the Holy Roman Empire and the Austro-Hungarian Empire, and others.

In 840, Charlemagne's son Louis the Pious died. The Carolingian Empire was divided among Louis' three sons by the Treaty of Verdun of 843. The middle realm, known as Middle Francia, went to Lothair I, reaching from Frisia in Northern Germany through the Low Countries, Eastern France, Burgundy, Provence, Northern Italy, and down to Rome. On the death of Lothair I, Middle Francia was divided in three by the Treaty of Prüm in 855, with the northern third called Lotharingia and going to Lothair II. Due to Lotharingia being sandwiched between East and West Francia, the rulers identified as a duchy from 870 onward, enabling the duchy to ally and align itself nominally with either eastern or western Carolingian kingdoms in order to survive and maintain its independence. Thus, it was a duchy in name but operated as an independent kingdom.

In 870, Lorraine allied with East Francia while remaining an autonomous duchy. In 962, when Otto I, Holy Roman Emperor, restored the Empire (restauratio imperii), Lorraine was designated as the autonomous Duchy of Lorraine within the Holy Roman Empire. It maintained this status until 1766, after which it was annexed under succession law by the Kingdom of France, via derivative aristocratic house alliances. 

The succession within these houses, in tandem with other historical events, would have later restored Lorraine's status as its own duchy, but a vacuum in leadership occurred. Its duke Francois Stephen de Lorraine took the throne of the Holy Roman Empire as Francis I, and his brother Prince Charles Alexander of Lorraine became governor of the Austrian Netherlands. For political reasons, he decided to hide those heirs who were not born by his first wife, Archduchess Maria Anna of Austria, who was deceased when he took office.

The vacuum in leadership, the French Revolution, and the political results and changes issuing from the many nationalistic wars that followed in the next 130 years, ultimately resulted in Lorraine becoming a permanent part of the modern Republic of France. Because of wars, it came under control of Germany several times as the border between the nations shifted. While Lorrainian separatists do exist in the 21st century, their political power and influence is negligible. Lorraine separatism today consists more of preserving its cultural identity rather than seeking genuine political independence.

With enlightened leadership and at a crossroads between French and German cultures, Lotharingia experienced tremendous economic, artistic, and cultural prosperity during the 12th and 13th centuries under the Hohenstaufen emperors. Along with the rest of Europe, this prosperity was terminated in Lorraine in the 14th century by a series of harsh winters, bad harvests, and the Black Death. During the Renaissance, a flourishing prosperity returned to Lotharingia until the Thirty Years' War. 

France inherited Lorraine in 1766. Due to the region's location, the population has been mixed. The north is largely German, speaking Lorraine Franconian and other German dialects. Strong centralized nationalism had only begun to replace the feudalist system which had formed the multilingual borders, and insurrection against the French occupation influenced much of the area's early identity. In 1871, the German Empire regained a part of Lorraine (Bezirk Lothringen, corresponding to the current department of Moselle). The department formed part of the new German Empire's Imperial Territory of Alsace–Lorraine. In the French Third Republic, the revanchist movement developed to recover this territory. 

The Imperial German administration strongly discouraged the French language and culture in favor of High German, which became the administrative language (Geschäftssprache.) It required the use of German in schools in areas which it considered or designated as German-speaking, an often arbitrary categorisation. French was allowed to remain in use only in primary and secondary schools in municipalities definitely considered Francophone, such as Château-Salins and the surrounding arrondissement, as well and in their local administration. 

But after 1877, higher education, including state-run colleges, universities and teacher seminaries, was conducted exclusively in German. The predominance of German and the partial usage of French, though restricted, were both guaranteed by the 1911 constitution of Alsace-Lorraine. While many toponyms of German etymology in Lorraine were adapted to the High German standard (i.e. Germanised) a number of genuine Francophone toponyms remained untouched. During the Nazi occupation between 1940 and 1944, however, its government imposed arbitrary German translations to replace all French names. For instance, Château-Salins was called Salzburg in Lothringen.
 
During the Battle of the Frontiers at the beginning of World War I, the French First Army invaded Lorraine and briefly occupied Mulhouse. However, the German Sixth Army under Crown Prince Rupprecht of Bavaria counterattacked and forced the French forces into retreat at the Battles of Sarrebourg and Morhange. Lorraine remained under martial law, close to the Western Front in northeastern France, and suffering from refugee crises for the rest of the war. The population effectively revolted against German rule by participating in the German Revolution of 1918–1919, and welcomed French troops into the region several days later. 

In the 1919 Treaty of Versailles, the Weimar Republic suffered severe territorial losses following World War I, including the portion of Lorraine territory that had been part of its state of Alsace-Lorraine. With the exception of its de facto annexation by Nazi Germany as part of the Gau Westmark during World War II, that area has since remained a part of France. During that war, the cross of Lorraine was a symbol of Free France.

Development of the borders in modern history 

The administrative region of Lorraine is larger than the 18th century duchy of Lorraine, which gradually came under French sovereignty between 1737 and 1766. The modern region includes provinces and areas that were historically separate from the duchy of Lorraine proper. These are:
 Barrois
 Three Bishoprics: non-contiguous territories around Metz, Verdun, and Toul, which were detached from the Holy Roman Empire in the 16th century and came under French sovereignty.
 Several small principalities, which were still part of the Holy Roman Empire at the time of the French Revolution.

Some historians consider the traditional province of Lorraine as limited to the duchy of Lorraine proper, while others consider that it includes Barrois and the Three Bishoprics. The duchy of Lorraine was originally the duchy of upper Lorraine, and did not include the entire area since called Lorraine.

The case of Barrois is the most complicated: the western part of Barrois (west of the Meuse), known as Barrois mouvant, was detached from the rest of Barrois in the early 14th century and taken over by French sovereignty. The largest part of Barrois (east of the Meuse River) was the Duchy of Bar, part of the Holy Roman Empire. In the 15th century, it was united with the Duchy of Lorraine by the marriage of the Duke of Bar, René of Anjou, with Isabella, daughter of the Duke of Lorraine. Thus the duchies of Bar and Lorraine were united in personal union under the same duke, although formally they were officially separate until being annexed and incorporated into the Kingdom of France in 1766.

During the French Revolution, four departments were created from the main parts of the territories of Barrois, Three Bishoprics and the Duchy of Lorraine: 
Meuse, 
Meurthe, 
Moselle and 
Vosges. 
After 1870 some parts of Moselle and Meurthe became German. Of the remaining parts, France formed the new department named Meurthe-et-Moselle. After 1918 and the Great War, France took over control again of Moselle. 

When France created its administrative regions in the middle of the 20th century, it decided to gather Meurthe et Moselle, Meuse, Moselle and Vosges into a single region, known as Lorraine.

Geography 

Lorraine is the only French region to have borders with three other countries: Belgium (Wallonia), Luxembourg, and Germany (Saarland, Rhineland-Palatinate). It also borders the French regions of Franche-Comté, Champagne-Ardenne, which were at times part of historical Lorraine Lotharingia, and Alsace, which, while still part of Lorraine's identity, is now a separate administrative region.  

Most of the region forms part of the Paris Basin, with a plateau relief cut by river valleys presenting cuestas in the north–south direction. The eastern part is sharper with the Vosges. Many rivers run through Lorraine, including Moselle, Meurthe, and Meuse. Most of them are on the Rhine drainage basin.

Lorraine has an oceanic climate with continental influences.

Language and culture 

Most of Lorraine has a clear French identity, with the exception of the northeastern part of the region, today known as Moselle, which historically has had an ethnic German, and German-speaking, population. 

In 1871, Bismarck annexed about a third of today's Lorraine to the new federation of the German Empire following a decisive victory in the Franco-Prussian War. This disputed third has a culture not easily classifiable as either French or German, since both Romance and German dialects are spoken here. Like many border regions, Lorraine was a patchwork of ethnicities and dialects not mutually intelligible with either standard French or German (see linguistic boundary of Moselle).

Traditionally, two languages are native to Lorraine. The first is Lorrain, which is a moribund minority Romance language that is spoken in southeastern Lorraine. The second is the German dialect of Lorraine Franconian, a group of three Franconian dialects independently surviving in northern and western Lorraine. They are referred to collectively as Plàtt in Franconian or francique or platt (lorrain) in French (not to be confused with Lorrain, the Romance language). Now mainly rural and isolated, these dialects gradually differ in the region, though they are mutually intelligible. Lorraine Franconian is distinct from neighbouring Alsatian, to the south, although the two are often confused. Neither of them has official status where they are spoken, but Alsatian is far more widely used. 

Technically, Lorraine Franconian is a catch-all term for what were historically three dialects: Luxemburgish, Mosel Franconian, and Rhine Franconian. Each is identical to the same dialects spoken in the neighboring Rhineland of Germany.

Like most of France's regional languages (e.g. Basque, Breton, West Flemish, Catalan, Provençal, and Alsatian), Lorrain and Lorraine Franconian have largely been replaced in use by French. For more than a century, nationalistic policies of the central government required public schooling to be conducted only in French. Now, however, there are efforts being made to revive Lorraine Franconian, whose linguistic vitality is still relatively high. Recent efforts include the use of bilingual signs in Franconian areas, and Franconian-language classes for young children whose parents can no longer speak their ancestral language.

Cross of Lorraine 

During World War II, the cross was adopted as the official symbol of the Free French Forces (French: Forces Françaises Libres, or FFL) under Charles de Gaulle. Georges Thierry d'Argenlieu suggested the adoption of the Cross of Lorraine as the symbol of the Free French.

In his General Order No. 2 of 3 July 1940, Vice-Admiral Émile Muselier, chief of the naval and air forces of the Free French for two days, created the bow flag displaying the French colours with a red Cross of Lorraine, and a cockade also featuring the Cross of Lorraine.

De Gaulle is memorialised at his home village of Colombey-les-Deux-Églises by a gigantic 44.3-meter (145 feet) high Cross of Lorraine.

Cuisine 
The use of the potato in Lorraine can be traced back to 1665. It was imported to Europe from South America. It is used in what developed as various traditional dishes of the region, such as the potée lorraine. The Breux potato, which takes its name from the village of Breux in the north of the Meuse, is considered to be excellent due to the perfect conditions of the area for its cultivation.

Smoked bacon is also a traditional ingredient of the cuisine of Lorraine. It is used in various traditional dishes of the region, including the famous quiche Lorraine. The mirabelle plum of Lorraine is the emblematic fruit of Lorraine. It is used in pies and other desserts, as well as in alcoholic beverages.

Traditional dishes in the region include:

 Quiche Lorraine
 Pâté lorrain (chopped pork and veal flavoured with white wine and baked in puff pastry)
 Potée lorraine (a stew of smoked meats and sausages, with cabbage, potatoes and other root vegetables)
 Andouille (tripe sausage)

Traditional cheeses of Lorraine include the following: Carré de l'Est, Brouère, Munster-géromé, Tourrée de l'Aubier.

Desserts from the region include: Madeleine, Macaron, Rum baba, Plombières ice-cream, various pie recipes (brimbelles bilberry, mirabelle plum, rhubarb, quark...). The Christstollen is also popular in Lorraine during the Christmas season.

Beverages 

 Wine: The most well-known wine of the region is the Côtes de Toul. There are vineyards in the valley of the Moselle, the valley of Seille, the valley of Metz, and the valley of Sierck.
 Beer: Historically, Lorraine was the location of many breweries. The Champigneulles brewery, founded on June 20, 1897, is the last remaining large-scale brewery. In 2016, it was the second largest brewer in France, after Kronenbourg.

Traditions 
Lorraine has a Roman Catholic heritage. Almost every village has a church, often centuries old, although many do not have a dedicated priest anymore. Church bells are traditionally rung to announce Angelus time (and often toll the hours). By tradition, they do not toll during Holy Week preceding Easter. Instead, the children of the villages play ratchets and announce, C'est l'Angélus! (It's the Angelus). After Easter, the children go from house to house and receive small presents for their service.

Sinterklaas is celebrated in Lorraine, where he is called "Saint Nicolas". Each year, more than 150,000 people gather in the streets of Nancy to celebrate Sinterklaas. A total of that number gather in other areas across the region.

Housing
Except for dispersed settlement in the Vosges mountains, traditional farms display linked houses, forming linear villages. They are built quite far from the road. The area between the house and the road is called . Until the 1970s, the usoir was used to store farming tools, firewood, or manure. Today this area is generally used as a garden or for car parking.

Furniture developed a specific identity after the Thirty Years' War: the "Lorrain style".

Economy 

At €44 billion (in 2000), Lorraine generates 3.4% of France's GDP. Despite ranking 11th in population, it ranks 8th in GDP out of the 22 regions of France, making it per capita among the top economic producing regions in the country, along with Alsace and Île-de-France (Paris). The logistics and service sectors have experienced the strongest growth in recent years. The traditional industries (textiles, mining, metallurgy) have undergone a decline due to restructuring and the move of some jobs offshore. Consequently, the region has struggled with rising unemployment, although its rate is still below the national average. In 1997 the last iron ore mine in Lorraine was closed; it had once produced more than 50 million tonnes of iron.

Major communities 
 Épinal
 Forbach
 Lunéville
 Metz
 Montigny-lès-Metz
 Nancy
 Saint-Dié-des-Vosges
 Sarreguemines
 Vandœuvre-lès-Nancy
 Thionville

Fauna and flora

Fauna 
 Eurasian lynx
 Fox
European wolf

Flora 
 Ash tree
 Beech
 Buxus boxwood
 Fern
 Geranium
 Hornbeam
 Lily of the Valley
 Maple
 Mirabelle
 Sage
 Spruce
 Thistle

Notable Lorrainers

Art and literature 

 Jacques Callot (1592–1635)
 Claude Lorrain (Claude Gellée) (1600–1682) 
 Émile Erckmann (1822–1899)
 Alexandre Chatrian (1826–1890)
 Paul Verlaine (1844–1896)
 Émile Jules Gallé (1846–1904)
 Jules Bastien-Lepage (1848–1884)
 Eugène Vallin (1856–1922)
 Émile Durkheim (1858–1917) (pictured)
 Victor Prouvé (1858–1943)
 Louis Majorelle (1859–1926)
 Lucien Weissenburger (1860–1929)
 Émile Friant (1863–1932)
 Paul Charbonnier (1865–1953)
 Henri Bergé (1870–1937)
 Jacques Gruber (1870–1936)
 Émile André (1871–1933)
 Jean-Marie Straub (1933–)
 Bernard-Marie Koltès (1948–1989)
 Philippe Claudel (1962–)
 Georges de La Tour (1593–1652)

Economy and industry 
 Albert Bergeret (1859–1932)
 Antonin (1864–1930) and Auguste Daum (1853–1909)

Military 

 Godfrey de Bouillon (1060–1100)
 Georges Mouton (1770–1838)
 Jean Baptiste Eblé (1758–1812)
 Nicolas Oudinot (1767–1848)
 Joseph Léopold Sigisbert Hugo (1774–1828)
 Louis-Hubert Lyautey (1854–1934)
 Charles Mangin (1866–1925)

Musicians and actors 
 Florent Schmitt (1870–1958)
 Darry Cowl (1925–2006)
 Charlélie Couture (1956–)
 Tom Novembre (1959–)
 Patricia Kaas (1966–)

Politicians 

 Pierre-Louis Roederer (1754–1835)
 Jules Ferry (1832–1893)
 Raymond Poincaré (1860–1934) (pictured to the right)
 Maurice Barrès (1862–1923)
 Albert Lebrun (1871–1950)
 Robert Schuman (1886–1963)
 Jack Lang (1939–)
 Christian Poncelet (1928–) (French politician, President of the Senate 1998–2008)
 Aurélie Filippetti (1973–)

Religion 
 Bruno d'Eguisheim-Dagsbourg, also known as Pope Leo IX (1002–1054)
 Henri Grégoire (1750–1831)
 Joan of Arc (1412–1431)

Sciences 
 Benoit de Maillet (1656–1738)
 Charles Messier (1730–1817)
 Jean-François Pilâtre de Rozier (1757–1785)
 Jean-Victor Poncelet (1788–1867)
 Charles Hermite (1822–1901)
 Edmond Laguerre (1834–1886)
 Henri Poincaré (1854–1912)
 Marie Marvingt (1875–1963)
 Louis Camille Maillard (1878–1936)
 Hubert Curien (1924–2005)

Sport 
 Michel Platini (1955–)
 Patrick Battiston (1957–)
 Morgan Parra (1988–)

Miscellaneous 
 Antoine de Ville
 Raymond Schwartz (1894–1973)
 Nicolas Chopin (1771–1844)
 Pierre Gaxotte (1895–1982)

See also 
 Belgian Lorraine
 Côtes de Toul
 List of rulers of Lorraine
 Lorraine (duchy)
 Lotharingia
 Saar-Warndt coal mining basin

Notes

References

Further reading 
 Putnam, Ruth. Alsace and Lorraine: From Cæsar to Kaiser, 58 B.C.-1871 A.D. New York: 1915.
 Bontemps, Daniel and Martine Bontemps-Litique, with Nelly Benoit, Virginie Legrand and Jean-Pierre Thiollet, Les noms de famille en Lorraine, Archives et Culture, Paris,1999

External links 
 
 
 Lorraine : Between war and art: memories Lorraine - Official French website (in English)
 A short guide to the Lorraine region and its main attractions
 MyLorraine.fr - Share your Lorraine
 Business in Lorraine

 
NUTS 2 statistical regions of the European Union